Aulden is a small hamlet in Herefordshire, England, in Leominster civil parish about four miles southwest of Leominster, on the road towards Birley.

External links

Hamlets in Herefordshire